Beberbach may refer to:

Beberbach (Humme), a river of North Rhine-Westphalia and Lower Saxony, Germany, tributary of the Humme
Beberbach (Schunter), a river of Lower Saxony, Germany, tributary of the Schunter